Beautiful Dreamer is a 2006 romantic drama film directed by Terri Farley Teruel. The film stars Brooke Langton and Colin Egglesfield as childhood sweethearts who become husband and wife as America enters World War II. Beautiful Dreamer is loosely based on real-life events that occurred on a Consolidated B-24 Liberator bombing mission during World War II and the aftermath of the war as it affected a small family.

Plot
Soon after childhood sweethearts Joe Kelly (Colin Egglesfield) and Claire (Brooke Langton) get married, Joe, a former cropduster, becomes a Consolidated B-24 Liberator bomber pilot in United States Army Air Force. During a mission over Germany, he crashes his bomber and is captured. After suffering a head wound, he is given a fallen comrade's dog tags and assumes that identity. As a result, he is presumed dead.

After the war, Claire and Joe's grandfather, William Kelly (Barry Corbin), struggle to make a new life at "Kelly's Field", a small aerial maintenance operation in Boone City, California. At lunch with one of Joe's crew members and his wife, Claire finds out that Joe did not die in the crash. A year after, he was seen in the back of a truck, surrounded by German guards.

Claire pledges to find Joe, and after going through army records, as well as visiting veterans hospitals, she is not dissuaded. When she is directed to Martin-Warner Aviation in Harris, California, to meet with William Martin (William Lee Scott), the trail runs cold until her car breaks down in the town and she spots Joe at Ruby's, the local cafe.

Claire is shocked that he does not recognize her and is known as "Tommy" (Thomas Warner). Tommy is conflicted, trying to understand who this woman is to him. Grandpa Kelly, on advice from Dr. Kessler (James Denton), counsels her to not try to tell Tommy the truth, as an amnesiac would not survive any more psychotic events. As a partner of William Martin, Tommy repairs aircraft, and serves as their chief pilot. Claire takes a job as a waitress at Ruby's. William flirts with her, but she ignores him, although accepting his invitation to visit the shop. Claire encounters Rachael Thompson (Lauren Woodland) whom she sees is in love with Tommy.

After a falling out with William, Tommy is afraid that a botched contract to ship goods could mean the end of their business. Claire offers to help, setting up a deal with Grandpa Kelly to obtain parts to convert a derelict B-24 bomber into a cargo aircraft to satisfy the contract. Tommy's memory is starting to come back, but Claire is worried that Rachael is vying to marry him.

At dance night at Ruby's, William and Rachael dance together, while Tommy dances with Claire, but flashbacks of an earlier life begin to occur. When he is in the old B-24, he begins to remember the crash where he was severely injured, but managed to pull a crewmate out of the wreckage. When Claire tries to help, he pushes her away. Heartbroken, she takes her wedding ring off, trading it for money to return home.

At the shop, Tommy and William have a successful test flight with the restored B-24 bomber, with Claire and many townspeople watching the flight. She leaves soon after.  In the air, Tommy relives the shock of the wartime crash and collapses, unconscious. William brings the aircraft in to a safe landing and rushes Tommy to the hospital.

Tommy recovers, and realizes he is Joe Kelly and has a previous life. At home, when Claire is out for a walk to the pond where Joe had proposed to her, she sees a B-24 bomber fly over and runs after it, hoping Joe has returned. Reaching the aircraft, Clair and Joe reunite, with him giving her back her wedding ring.

Cast

 Brooke Langton as Claire Kelly
 Colin Egglesfield as Joe Kelly/Tomas "Tommy" Weaver
 James Denton as Dr. Kessler
 Barry Corbin as William Kelly, "Grandpa"
 Rusty Schwimmer as Jeannie
 William Lee Scott as William Martin
 Lauren Woodland as Rachael Thompson
 Elise Jackson as Sherry
 Rusty Schwimmer as Jeannie
 Susan Barnes as Ruby
 Tom Everett as Colonel Baynes
 Elise Jackson as Sherry
 Lauren Woodland as Racheal
 Channon Roe as Ray (credited as Shannon Roe)
 Brett Moses as Pete Newell
 Tim Ryan as Douglas
 Duke Stroud as Colonel Chambers

Production
Beautiful Dreamer is loosely based on the lives of the crew of the Consolidated B-24 Liberator Starduster. Captain Willis Miller was a B-24 pilot in World War II who was a member of the 392 Bomb Group, 577th/579th Squadron, 2nd Division, of the 8th Air Force. The Starduster crew flew over 30 missions over Europe, suffering no casualties throughout the war despite risking their lives every day. While flying a mission in their B-24 over Eastern Europe, Miller and crew was involved in a fire fight which damaged the aircraft. Miller crash-landed the bomber with no fatalities.

Willis and his wife, Dorothy Miller, were the major funders of the film. Their daughter Dottie Miller-Sublett and her husband Brad Sublett, created "Dott's Starduster" as a production company to not only fund the production, but also to act as executive producers. Appearing before the end credits is the statement: "Beautiful Dreamer is dedicated to Willis and Dorothy Miller and the brave men of the B-24 Liberator 'Starduster'." Following was a list of the crew, their individual combat records and list of support staff that maintained the aircraft.

Principal photography took place over a 17-day period in Los Angeles, Sable Ranch, Disney Ranch, Camarillo and Whiteman Airports, California. The aircraft in the film included actual B-24 Liberator bombers, as well as computer-generated imagery. The other aircraft that were seen include the Boeing-Stearman Kaydet trainer and crop duster and Beechcraft Model 18 light transport and training aircraft.

Reception
In his review for Reel Film Reviews, David Nusair wrote, "Beautiful Dreamer, anchored by an undercurrent of palpable romance, establishes itself as an old-fashioned melodrama that's ultimately impossible to resist."

Madelyn Ritrosky for Entertainment Magazine noted:

Awards
Beautiful Dreamer was entered in a number of film festivals, winning significant awards. In the 2006 Central Florida Film Festival, the film won Best Feature, Best Feature Film and Audience Favorite Award. At the George Lindsey 2007 UNA Film Festival, Beautiful Dreamer won the Gold Lion for Best Professional Full-Length Narrative. At the 2006 Temecula Valley International Film Festival, the film won the Jury Award for Best Feature Film.

References

Notes

Citations

Bibliography

 Orriss, Bruce. When Hollywood Ruled the Skies: The Aviation Film Classics of World War II. Hawthorn, California: Aero Associates Inc., 1984. .

External links
 
 
 
 

2006 romantic drama films
2006 films
American aviation films
American romantic drama films
American war drama films
American World War II films
2000s war drama films
2000s English-language films
2000s American films